St. Leo is a town in Pasco County, Florida, United States.  It is a suburb included in the Tampa-St. Petersburg-Clearwater, Florida Metropolitan Statistical Area.  The population was 1,340 at the 2010 census. It is best known as the home of St. Leo University, Holy Name Monastery and St. Leo Abbey. Vincent D'Ambrosio currently serves as the commission-elected mayor of the town, elected in 2022.

History
In 1889 the Benedictines established the monastery of St. Leo and St. Leo College on Judge Edmund F. Dunne's former homestead and farm land east of San Antonio, Florida on the shores of Lake Jovita, later incorporating the area as part of a new town called St. Leo.

Dunne was a legal counsel involved in the Disston Land Purchase of 1881, and as his commission, received 100,000 choice acres (400 km2) of land out of the 4,000,000 acre (16,000 km) purchase. The following year on February 15, while surveying the Disston Purchase with his cousin, Captain Hugh Dunne, Dunne selected the area around Lake Jovita, which he named after St. Jovita, as his commission and began settling it. He first established the Catholic colony of San Antonio in 1882, and later added the surrounding villages of Saint Joseph, Saint Thomas, Villa Maria, Carmel and San Felipe. Only the rural community of Saint Joseph survives today. The area of what is now the Town of St. Leo, although originally platted as another village by Dunne, did not receive its name until after the arrival of the Benedictine monks. The present name is derived from Pope Leo IX.

Geography

St. Leo is located at  (28.337929, –82.253265).

St. Leo contains rolling hills with elevations from 100 ft to 180 ft.

Climate

Demographics

As of the census of 2000, there were 595 people, 41 households, and 30 families residing in the town. The racial makeup of the town was 85.38% White, 8.57% African American, 1.85% Asian, 0.17% Pacific Islander, 0.67% from other races, and 3.36% from two or more races. Hispanic or Latino of any race were 8.91% of the population.

There were 41 households, out of which 43.9% had children under the age of 18 living with them, 56.1% were married couples living together, 12.2% had a female householder with no husband present, and 24.4% were non-families. 22.0% of all households were made up of individuals, and 9.8% had someone living alone who was 65 years of age or older.  The average household size was 2.63 and the average family size was 3.10.

In the town, the population was spread out, with 5.5% under the age of 18, 77.0% from 18 to 24, 6.4% from 25 to 44, 6.2% from 45 to 64, and 4.9% who were 65 years of age or older.  The median age was 20 years. For every 100 females, there were 91.9 males.  For every 100 females age 18 and over, there were 91.8 males.

The median income for a household in the town was $37,917, and the median income for a family was $39,583. Males had a median income of $35,000 versus $7,250 for females. The per capita income for the town was $8,384.  About 11.4% of families and 19.9% of the population were below the poverty line, including 18.8% of those under age 18 and 26.3% of those age 65 or over.

References

Towns in Pasco County, Florida